Two-spirit (also two spirit, 2S or, occasionally, twospirited) is a modern, umbrella term used by some Indigenous North Americans to describe Native people in their communities who fulfill a traditional third-gender (or other gender-variant) ceremonial and social role in their cultures.

The term Two Spirit (original form chosen) was created in 1990 at the Indigenous lesbian and gay international gathering in Winnipeg, and "specifically chosen to distinguish and distance Native American/First Nations people from non-Native peoples". The primary purpose of coining a new term was to encourage the replacement of the outdated and considered offensive, anthropological term, berdache. This new term has not been universally accepted, having been criticized as a term of erasure by traditional communities who already have their own terms for the people being grouped under this new term, and by those who reject what they call the "Western" binary implications, such as implying that Natives believe these individuals are "both male and female". However, it has generally received more acceptance and use than the anthropological term it replaced.

"Two Spirit" was not intended to be interchangeable with "LGBT Native American" or "Gay Indian"; rather, it was created in English (and then translated into Ojibwe), to serve as a pan-Indian unifier: to be used for general audiences instead of the traditional terms in Indigenous languages for what are diverse, culturally-specific ceremonial and social roles, that can vary widely (if and when they exist at all). Opinions vary as to whether or not this objective has succeeded. The decision to adopt this new, pan-Indian term was also made to distance themselves from non-Native gays and lesbians, as the term and identity of two-spirit "does not make sense" unless it is contextualized within a Native American or First Nations framework and traditional cultural understanding. However, the gender-nonconforming, LGBT, or third and fourth gender, ceremonial roles traditionally embodied by Native American people and Indigenous peoples in Canada, intended to be under the modern umbrella of two-spirit, can vary widely, even among the Indigenous people who accept the English-language term. No one Native American/First Nations' culture's gender or sexuality categories apply to all, or even a majority of, these cultures.

Terminology

Etymology
The neologism two-spirit was created in English, then translated into Ojibwe, in 1990 at the third annual Native American/First Nations gay and lesbian conference in Winnipeg, Manitoba, Canada, as a replacement for the offensive, anthropological term, berdache. The Ojibwe translation  was proposed to honor the language of the Peoples in whose territory the conference was being held. This term had not been previously used, in either Ojibwe or English, until this conference in 1990, nor was this term ever intended to replace the traditional terms or concepts already in use in any Native cultures. 

The decision to adopt this new, pan-Indian term was deliberate, with a clear intention to distance themselves from non-Native gays and lesbians, as well as from non-Native terminology like berdache, "gay", "lesbian", and "trans". The primary purpose of coining a new term was to encourage the replacement of the outdated, and offensive, anthropological term berdache, which means "passive partner in sodomy, boy prostitute". Cameron writes, "The term two-spirit is thus an Aboriginal-specific term of resistance to colonization and non-transferable to other cultures. There are several underlying reasons for two spirited Aboriginals' desire to distance themselves from the mainstream queer community." Lang explains that for Aboriginal people, their sexual orientation or gender identity is secondary to their ethnic identity. She states, "at the core of contemporary two-spirit identities is ethnicity, an awareness of being Native American as opposed to being white or being a member of any other ethnic group".

It is unclear who first coined the term two-spirit in English. Pember notes the involvement of non-Native Will Roscoe who, like his also non-Native mentor Harry Hay, is involved in the hippie/counterculture gay men's group, the Radical Faeries, a "non-Native community that emulates Native spirituality" and engages in other forms of cultural appropriation: "Non-Native anthropologist Will Roscoe gets much of the public credit for coining the term two spirit. However, according to Kristopher Kohl Miner of the Ho-Chunk Nation, Native people such as anthropologist Dr. Wesley Thomas of the Dine or Navajo tribe also contributed to its creation. (Thomas is a professor in the School of Dine and Law Studies.)" More recently, Myra Laramee, (Anishinaabe) has said that she proposed the term at the 1990 gathering after the phrase came to her in a dream.

Some who enthusiastically took up the term and used it in the media said that this new, English-language term carried on the full meaning and implications of the Indigenous-language terms used in-community for the specific traditional, ceremonial roles that the anthropologists had referred to – emphasizing the role of the Elders in recognizing a two-spirit person, stressing that "Two Spirit" is not interchangeable with "LGBT Native American" or "Gay Indian", and that the title differs from most Western, mainstream definitions of sexuality and gender identity in that it is not a modern, self-chosen term of personal sexual or gender "identity", but is a sacred, spiritual and ceremonial role that is recognized and confirmed by the Elders of the Two Spirit's ceremonial community. Talking to The New York Times in 2006, Joey Criddle said, "The elders will tell you the difference between a gay Indian and a Two-Spirit ... underscoring the idea that simply being gay and Indian does not make someone a Two-Spirit."

Criticism of the term
Even though it has gained far more mainstream recognition and popularity than any of the traditional terms in Indigenous languages, the term has never met with universal acceptance. While use of the term to replace berdache proceeded, the word also began to replace tribally-specific terms and cultural teachings, leading to criticism, largely from more traditional members of Indian Country: "Nations and tribes used various words to describe various genders, sexes and sexualities. Many had separate words for the Western constructs of gays, lesbians, bisexuals, intersex individuals, cross-dressers, transgenders, gender-variant individuals, or 'changing ones', third genders (men who live as women), and fourth genders (women who live as men) Even these categories are limiting, because they are based on Western language and ideas rooted in a dichotomous relationship between gender, sex, and sexuality. This language barrier limits our understanding of the traditional roles within Native American/First Nations cultures."

Even at the series of conferences where the term was gradually adopted (1990 being the third of five), concern was expressed by a number of the Native attendees that traditional Natives back in the reservation communities would never agree to this newly-coined concept, or adopt the neologism being used to describe it: "At the conferences that produced the book, Two-Spirited People, I heard several First Nations people describe themselves as very much unitary, neither 'male' nor 'female', much less a pair in one body. Nor did they report an assumption of duality within one body as a common concept within reservation communities; rather, people confided dismay at the Western proclivity for dichotomies. Outside Indo-European-speaking societies, 'gender' would not be relevant to the social personae glosses 'men' and 'women', and 'third gender' likely would be meaningless. The unsavory word 'berdache' certainly ought to be ditched (Jacobs et al. 1997:3-5), but the urban American neologism 'two-spirit' can be misleading."

Other concerns about this pan-Indian, English-language term have centered around the binary nature of two-spirit, a sense not found in the traditional names for these individuals or their roles in traditional cultures: "It implies that the individual is both male and female and that these aspects are intertwined within them. The term moves away from traditional Native American/First Nations cultural identities and meanings of sexuality and gender variance. It does not take into account the terms and meanings from individual nations and tribes. ... Although two-spirit implies to some a spiritual nature, that one holds the spirit of two, both male and female, traditional Native Americans/First Nations peoples view this as a Western concept." 

Indigiqueer
Another contemporary term in use, as an alternative to two-spirit, and which does not rely on binary conceptions of gender, is Indigiqueer. Originally spelled Indigequeer, the term was coined by TJ Cuthand, and popularized by author Joshua Whitehead. Cuthand first used Indigiqueer for the title of the 2004 Vancouver Queer Film Festival’s Indigenous/two-spirit Program, and has written that he came up with this alternative term, "because some LGBTQ Indigenous people don’t feel as comfortable with the two-spirit title because it implies some dual gender stuff, which some people just don’t feel describes their identity."

Additional issues with two-spirit that others have voiced is that they see it as a capitulation to urbanization and loss of culture that, while initially intended to help people reconnect with the spiritual dimension of these roles, was not working out the way it had been intended. In 2009, writing for the Encyclopedia of Gender and Society, Kylan Mattias de Vries wrote:

With the urbanization and assimilation of Native peoples, individuals began utilizing Western terms, concepts, and identities, such as gay, lesbian, transgender, and intersex. These terms separated Native cultural identity from sexuality and gender identity, furthering a disconnect felt by many Native American/First Nations peoples in negotiating the boundaries of life between two worlds (Native and non-Native/Western). The term two-spirited was created to reconnect one's gender or sexual identity with her or his Native identity and culture. ...
Some Native Americans/First Nations people that hold to more traditional religious and cultural values view two-spirit as a cultural and social term, rather than one with any religious or spiritual meaning. ... Since historically, many "berdache/two-spirit" individuals held religious or spiritual roles, the term two spirit creates a disconnection from the past.

While some have found two-spirit a useful tool for intertribal organizing, "the concept and word two-spirit has no traditional cultural significance". Not all tribes have ceremonial roles for these people, and the tribes that do usually use names in their own languages.

Traditional Indigenous terms 
With over 500 surviving Native American cultures, attitudes about sex and gender can be diverse. Even with the modern adoption of pan-Indian terms like two-spirit, and the creation of a modern pan-Indian community around this naming, not all cultures will perceive two-spirits the same way, or welcome a pan-Indian term to replace the terms already in use by their cultures. Additionally, not all contemporary Indigenous communities are supportive of their gender-variant and non-heterosexual people now. In these communities, those looking for two-spirit community have sometimes faced oppression and rejection. While existing terminology in many nations shows historical acknowledgement of differing sexual orientations and gender expressions, members of some of these nations have also said that while variance was accepted, they never had separate or defined roles for these members of the community. Among the Indigenous communities that traditionally have roles for two-spirit people, specific terms in their own languages are used for the social and spiritual roles these individuals fulfill. The following list is not comprehensive.

Aleut: tayagigux''', "Woman transformed into a man."
Aleut: ayagigux', "Man transformed into a woman."
Blackfoot: , "Manly-hearted-woman." This term has a wide variety of meanings ranging from women who performed the roles of men, dressed as men, took female partners, or who participated in activities such as war. 
Blackfoot: , "A male homosexual."
Blackfoot: , "Acts like a woman." There are historical accounts of individuals who engaged in homosexual relationships, or who were born as men but lived their lives as women, possibly for religious or social reasons. These individuals were viewed in a wide variety of ways, from being revered spiritual leaders, brave warriors and artisans, to targets of ridicule.
, "A woman who dresses as a man."
, "A man who dresses as a woman."
, "A woman dressed/living/accepted as a man."; also given as "someone who fights everyone to prove they are the toughest".
, "A man dressed/living/accepted as a woman."; possibly not a respectful term; others have suggested it is a third gender designation, applied to both women and men.
, "One who acts/lives as a man."
, "One who acts/lives as a woman."
Crow: . A word that describes both trans women and homosexual males. 
 is the contraction of an older Lakota word, meaning "wants to be like a woman".  are a social category in historical Lakota culture, of male-bodied people who in some cases have adopted the clothing, work, and mannerisms that Lakota culture usually consider feminine. In contemporary Lakota culture, the term is most commonly associated with simply being gay. Both historically and in modern culture, usually  are homosexual, though they may or may not consider themselves part of the more mainstream LGBT communities. Some  participate in the pan-Indian Two Spirit community. In contemporary Lakota communities, attitudes towards the  vary from accepting to homophobic.
 (also given as ), "One who is transformed" or "one who changes".Lapahie, Harrison, Jr. Hosteen Klah (Sir Left Handed). Lapahie.com. 2001 (retrieved 19 Oct 2009) In traditional Navajo culture,  are male-bodied individuals described by those in their communities as "effeminate male", or as "half woman, half man". A 2009 documentary about the tragic murder of  Fred Martinez, entitled, Two Spirits, contributed to awareness of these terms and cultures. A Navajo gender spectrum that has been described is that of four genders: feminine woman, masculine woman, feminine man, masculine man.
Ojibwe: , "Women who functioned as men" / "one who endeavors to be like a man". 
Ojibwe: , "Men who chose to function as women" / "one who endeavors to be like a woman". Academic Anton Treuer wrote that in Ojibwe culture "[s]ex usually determined one's gender, and therefore one's work, but the Ojibwe accepted variation. Men who chose to function as women were called , meaning 'one who endeavors to be like a woman'. Women who functioned as men were called , meaning, 'one who endeavors to be like a man'. The French called these people berdaches.  and  could take spouses of their own sex. The  worked and dressed like women. The  worked and dressed like men. Both were considered to be strong spiritually, and they were always honoured, especially during ceremonies." The Ojibwe word agokwe was used by John Tanner to describe gender-nonconforming Ojibwe warrior Ozaawindib (fl. 1797-1832). Pruden and Edmo spell it agokwa: "male-assigned: Agokwa - 'man-woman'", along with "female-assigned: Okitcitakwe - 'warrior woman'".
, men who at times may also take on the social and ceremonial roles performed by women in their culture. Accounts from the 1800s note that , while dressed in "female attire", were often hired for work that required "strength and endurance", while also excelling in traditional arts and crafts such as pottery and weaving. Notable  We'wha (1849–1896), lived in both traditional female and male social and ceremonial roles at various points in their life, and was a respected community leader and cultural ambassador.Matilda Coxe Stevenson, The Zuni Indians: Their Mythology, Esoteric Fraternities, and Ceremonies, (BiblioBazaar, 2010) p. 37 Quote: "the most intelligent person in the pueblo. Strong character made his word law among both men and women with whom he associated. Though his wrath was dreaded by men as well as women, he was loved by all children, to whom he was ever kind."

 Contemporary issues 
The increasing visibility of the two-spirit concept in mainstream culture has been seen as both empowering and as having some undesirable consequences, such as the spread of misinformation about the cultures of Indigenous people, pan-Indianism, and cultural appropriation of Indigenous identities and ceremonial ways among non-Natives who do not understand that Indigenous communities see two-spirit as a specifically Native American and First Nations cultural identity, not one to be taken up by non-Natives.Cameron, Michelle. (2005). Two-spirited Aboriginal people: Continuing cultural appropriation by non-Aboriginal society. Canadian Women Studies, 24 (2/3), 123–127.
 These sort of simplified black-and-white depictions of Native culture and history perpetuate indiscriminate appropriation of Native peoples. Although the current new meme or legend surrounding the term two spirit is certainly laudable for helping LGBTQ people create their own more empowering terminology to describe themselves, it carries some questionable baggage.
My concern is not so much over the use of the words but over the social meme they have generated that has morphed into a cocktail of historical revisionism, wishful thinking, good intentions, and a soupçon of white, entitled appropriation.
Two-spirit does not acknowledge either the traditional acceptance or the nonacceptance of individuals in various nations and tribes. The idea of gender and sexuality variance being universally accepted among Native American/First Nations peoples has become romanticized. 
Accordingly, the change from berdache to two-spirit is most accurately understood as a non-Native idealization of the social acceptance of gender variance, idealizing a romanticized acceptance of gender variance.

For First Nations people whose lives have been impacted by the Residential Schools, and other Indigenous communities who have experienced severe cultural damage from colonization, the specific two-spirit traditions in their communities may have been severely damaged, fragmented, or even lost. In these cases there have been serious challenges to remembering and reviving their older traditional ways, and to overcoming the homophobia and other learned prejudices of forced assimilation.

When Indigenous people from communities that are less-accepting of two-spirits have sought community among non-Native LGBT communities, however, the tendency for non-Natives to tokenize and appropriate has at times led to rifts rather than unity, with two-spirits feeling like they are just another tacked on initial rather than fully included:

The term two-spirited was chosen to emphasize our difference in our experiences of multiple, interlocking oppressions as queer Aboriginal people. When non-Aboriginal people decide to "take up" the term two-spirit, it detracts from its original meaning and diffuses its power as a label of resistance for Aboriginal people. Already there is so much of First Nations culture that has been exploited and appropriated in this country; must our terms of resistance also be targeted for mainstream appropriation and consumption?

Two-spirited is a reclaimed term designed by Aboriginals to define our unique cultural context, histories, and legacy. When people do not see the harm in "sharing" the term, they are missing the point and refusing to recognize that by appropriating the term they will inevitably alter its cultural context.

In academia, there has since 2010 or earlier been a move to "queer the analytics of settler colonialism" and create a "twospirit" critique as part of the general field of queer studies.Smith, Andrea. "Queer Theory and Native Studies: The Heteronormativity of Settler Colonialism". GLQ: A Journal of Lesbian and Gay Studies 16.1–2 (2010): 41–68. Web. However, much of this academic analysis and publishing is not based in traditional indigenous knowledge, but in the more mainstream, non-Native perspectives of the broader LGBT communities, so most of the same cultural misunderstandings tend to be found as in the outdated writing of the non-Native anthropologists and "explorers". Claiming a viewpoint of "postidentity" analysis, supporters of "queer of color critique" aim to examine settler colonialism and the ongoing genocide of Native peoples while "queering Native Studies". However, Indigenous identity is predominantly cultural, rather than a racial classification. It is based on membership in a particular community, cultural fluency, citizenship, and Native American and First Nations people may or may not even consider themselves to be "people of color".

 Definition and societal role in Indigenous communities 
Male-bodied two-spirit people, regardless of gender identification, can go to war and have access to male activities such as male-only sweat lodge ceremonies. However, they may also take on "feminine" activities such as cooking and other domestic responsibilities.  According to Lang, female-bodied two-spirit people usually have sexual relations or marriages with only females.

 Two-spirit societies 
Among the goals of two-spirit societies are group support; outreach, education, and activism; revival of their Indigenous cultural traditions, including preserving the old languages, skills and dances; and otherwise working toward social change.

Some two-spirit societies (past and present) include: 2Spirits of Toronto in Toronto, Ontario; the Wabanaki Two Spirit Alliance in Nova Scotia; the Bay Area American Indian Two-Spirits (est. 1998) in San Francisco, California; Central Oklahoma Two Spirit Natives in Oklahoma City; the East Coast Two Spirit Society and the NorthEast Two-Spirit Society in New York City; Idaho Two-Spirit Society; the Indiana Two-Spirit Society in Bloomington; Minnesota Two Spirits; the Montana Two-Spirit Society in Browning; the Northwest Two-Spirit Society in Seattle, Washington; the Ohio Valley Two Spirit Society of Ohio, Indiana, Kentucky, and Southern Illinois; the Portland Two Spirit Society (est. May 2012) in Portland, Oregon; the Regina Two-Spirited Society in Regina, Saskatchewan; the Texas Two Spirit Society in Dallas; the Tulsa Two-Spirit Society in Tulsa, Oklahoma; the Two-Spirit Society of Denver in Denver, Colorado; and the Wichita Two-Spirit Society in Wichita, Kansas.

 Historical and anthropological accounts 

Unfortunately, depending on an oral tradition to impart our ways to future generations opened the floodgates for early non-Native explorers, missionaries, and anthropologists to write books describing Native peoples and therefore bolstering their own role as experts. These writings were and still are entrenched in the perspective of the authors who were and are mostly white men.

According to German anthropologist Sabine Lang, cross-dressing of two-spirit people was not always an indicator of gender identity. Lang believes "the mere fact that a male wears women's clothing does not say something about his role behavior, his gender status, or even his choice of partner". Other anthropologists may have mistakenly labelled some Native individuals two-spirit or berdache because of a lack of cultural understanding, specifically around an Indigenous community's worldview, and their particular customs concerning clothing and gender.

According to non-Natives including author Brian Gilley and anthropologist Will Roscoe, the historical presence of male-bodied two-spirits "was a fundamental institution among most tribal peoples", with both male- and female-bodied two-spirits having been documented "in over 130 North American tribes, in every region of the continent". However, Ojibwe journalist Mary Annette Pember argues that this depiction threatens to homogenize diverse Indigenous cultures, painting over them with an overly broad brush, potentially causing the disappearance of "distinct cultural and language differences that Native peoples hold crucial to their identity".

Don Pedro Fages was third in command of the 1769–70 Spanish Portolá expedition, the first European land exploration of what is now the U.S. state of California. At least three diaries were kept during the expedition, but Fages wrote his account later, in 1775. Fages gave more descriptive details about the native Californians than any of the others, and he alone reported the presence of homosexuality in the native culture. The English translation reads:

I have submitted substantial evidence that those Indian men who, both here and farther inland, are observed in the dress, clothing and character of women – there being two or three such in each village – pass as sodomites by profession. ... They are called joyas, and are held in great esteem.

Although gender-variant people have been both respected and feared in a number of tribes, they are not beyond being reproached or, by traditional law, even killed for bad deeds. In the Mojave tribe, for instance, they frequently become medicine persons and, like all who deal with the supernatural, are at risk of suspicion of witchcraft, notably in cases of failed harvest or of death. There have been instances of murder in these cases (such as in the case of the gender-nonconforming female named Sahaykwisā). Another instance in the late 1840s was of a Crow badé who was caught, possibly raiding horses, by the Lakota and was killed.

Lang and Jacobs write that historically among the Apache, the Lipan, Chiricahua, Mescalero, and southern Dilzhe'e have alternative gender identities. One tribe in particular, the Eyak, has a single report from 1938 that they did not have an alternative gender and they held such individuals in low esteem, although whether this sentiment is the result of acculturation or not is unknown.

Among the Iroquois, there is a single report from Bacqueville de la Potherie in his book published in 1722, Histoire de l'Amérique septentrionale, that indicates that an alternative gender identity exists among them.

Many, if not all, Indigenous cultures have been affected by European homophobia and misogyny. Some sources have reported that the Aztecs and Incas had laws against such individuals, though there are some authors who feel that this was exaggerated or the result of acculturation, because all of the documents indicating this are post-conquest and any that existed before had been destroyed by the Spanish. The belief that these laws existed, at least for the Aztecs, comes from the Florentine Codex, and that evidence exists that indigenous peoples authored many codices, but the Spaniards destroyed most of them in their attempt to eradicate ancient beliefs.

Some contemporary Zapotec peoples in Mexico embody the traditional third gender role known as muxe.  They consider themselves to be "muxe in men's bodies", who do the work that their culture usually associates with women. When asked by transgender researchers in 2004 if they ever considered surgical transition, "none of the respondents found the idea interesting, but rather strange" as their essence as muxe is not dependent on what type of body they are in.

Berdache
Before the late twentieth-century, non-Native (i.e. non-Native American/Canadian) anthropologists used the term berdache, in a very broad manner, to identify an indigenous individual fulfilling one of many mixed gender roles in their tribe. Most often these anthropologists applied the term to any male whom they perceived to be homosexual, bisexual, or effeminate by Western social standards, though occasionally the term was applied to lesbian, bisexual and gender nonconforming females as well. This led to a wide variety of diverse individuals being categorized under this imprecise term. At times they incorrectly implied that these individuals were intersex (or, "hermaphrodites"). 

The term berdache has always been repugnant to Indigenous people. De Vries writes, "Berdache is a derogatory term created by Europeans and perpetuated by anthropologists and others to define Native American/First Nations people who varied from Western norms that perceive gender, sex, and sexuality as binaries and inseparable." The term has now fallen out of favor with anthropologists as well. It derives from the French  (English equivalent: "bardash") meaning "passive homosexual", "catamite" or even "boy prostitute".  Bardache, in turn, derived from the Persian  barda meaning "captive", "prisoner of war", "slave". Spanish explorers who encountered these individuals among the Chumash people called them "", the Spanish for "jewels".

Use of berdache has now been replaced in most mainstream and anthropological literature by two spirit, with mixed results. However, the term two spirit itself, in English or any other language, was not in use before 1990.

 Media representation 

In the 1970 film Little Big Man, the Cheyenne character Little Horse, portrayed by Robert Little Star, is a gay man who wears clothing more commonly worn by women in the culture. He invites the protagonist, Jack Crabb (Dustin Hoffman) to come live with him. In a departure from most portrayals in Westerns of the era, Crabb is touched and flattered by the offer.

The 2009 documentary film Two Spirits, directed by Lydia Nibley, tells the story of the hate-murder of 16-year-old Navajo Fred Martinez. In the film, Nibley "affirms Martinez' Navajo sense of being a two spirit 'effeminate male', or nádleeh". Martinez' mother defined nádleeh as "half woman, half man".

The film Two Spirits, shown on Independent Lens in 2011, and winner of the annual Audience Award for that year, is about two-spirit people, particularly Fred Martinez, who was murdered at age 16 for identifying as a two-spirit.

In 2017 two-spirited Metis filmmaker Marjorie Beaucage released a Coming In Stories: Two Spirit in Saskatchewan as way to raise awareness about the experiences of two-spirited individuals living in Saskatchewan, Canada.

In the 2018 indie film, The Miseducation of Cameron Post, a Lakota character – Adam Red Eagle, played by Forrest Goodluck – is sent to a conversion camp for identifying as winkte and two-spirit.

In the 2019, second season of American Gods, Kawennáhere Devery Jacobs (Mohawk) plays a young Cherokee woman, Sam Black Crow, who self-identifies as "two-spirited" (although in the book, she is mentioned in passing as being bisexual). Her character, raised by a white mother and estranged from her Native father, speaks of looking to older ancestors to try to find her own beliefs, much like the other humans in the series. In an interview she says, "I identify as queer, and not two-spirited, because I'm Mohawk and we don't have that" and that Neil Gaiman (author of the novels on which the series is based) advocated strongly for her to be cast in the role.Lovecraft Country, a 2020 HBO television series, features Yahima, an Arawak two-spirit character. Showrunner Misha Green addressed the fate of this character by tweeting "I wanted to show the uncomfortable truth that oppressed folks can also be oppressors. It's a story point worth making, but I failed in the way I chose to make it." The term "two-spirit" is used anachronistically in the series, being set in the 1950s whilst the term itself was coined in the 1990s.

 Tributes 

In 2012, a marker dedicated to two spirit people was included in the Legacy Walk, an outdoor public display in Chicago, Illinois, that celebrates LGBT history and people.

 Self-identified two spirits 
"Self-identified" here is meant as a contrast to the way a traditional two spirit must be recognized as such by the Elders of their Indigenous community when the term is used as a synonym for a traditional ceremonial role (for which there will be an already-existing term in that culture's Indigenous language). Inclusion in this list is thus not an indication of whether the person is recognized or not.

 
 Susan Allen (Lakota), Minnesota State Representative
 Yolanda Bonnell (Ojibwe), Canadian actress and playwright
 Alec Butler (Métis), Canadian playwright and filmmaker
 Chrystos (Menominee), writer and activist
 Raven Davis (Ojibwe), artist, activist, and traditional cultural worker 
 Blake Desjarlais (Cree/Metis), Canada's first two-spirit Member of Parliament. Elected in the 2021 Canadian federal election in the Edmonton Griesbach riding as a member of the New Democratic Party.
 Jeremy Dutcher (Wolastoqiyik), tenor, composer, musicologist, performer and activist
 Bretten Hannam (Mi'kmaq/Ojibwe), filmmaker
 Shawnee Kish (Mohawk), musician
 Richard LaFortune (Yupik), activist, author and artist
 James Makokis (Cree), physician
 Kent Monkman (Cree), visual and performing artist
 Rebecca Nagle (Cherokee), activist and writer
 Harlan Pruden (Cree), scholar and activist
 Smokii Sumac (Ktunaxa), poet and activist
 Arielle Twist (Cree), poet
 Ilona Verley (Nlaka'pamux), drag queen, contestant on Canada's Drag Race Storme Webber (Alutiiq and Choctaw), interdisciplinary artist
 Delina White (Ojibwe), activist, artist, clothing designer
 Joshua Whitehead (Oji-Cree), poet and novelist
 Massey Whiteknife (Cree), businessman, producer and entertainer
 Lori Campbell (Cree-Métis), educator and politician. 

 See also 

Gay American Indians
Gender roles among the indigenous peoples of North America
Koekchuch
Māhū, those "in the middle", between the polar genders, in some Pacific Islander indigenous communities
Mapuche
Native American identity in the United States
Osh-TischSipiniq, a third gender identity among the Inuit

 References 

Archival resources
 Two-Spirit Archives at the University of Winnipeg Archives

 External links 

 Language, culture, and Two-Spirit identity – âpihtawikosisân – Cree and other Indigenous perspectives 
 Native American 'Two-Spirit People' Serve Unique Roles Within Their Communities - One 'Winkte' Talks About Role Of LGBT People In Lakota Culture
 Two Spirit JournalSan Francisco Two-Spirit Powwow – 2017 video by award-winning photographer Matika Wilbur
 Two Spirits – 2009 documentary about nádleehí'' Fred Martinez, murdered at age 16

 
Indigenous rights in the United States
Third gender
Gender in North America
Gender systems
Transgender topics and religion